Norwest Venture Partners (Norwest) is an American venture and growth equity investment firm. The firm targets early to late-stage venture and growth equity investments across several sectors, including cloud computing and information technology, Internet, SaaS, business and financial services, and healthcare. Headquartered in Palo Alto, California, Norwest has offices in San Francisco and subsidiaries in Mumbai, India and Herzelia, Israel. The firm has funded more than 650 companies since inception. 

As of 2022, the firm has approximately 200 active companies across its venture and growth portfolio.

History

Northwest Venture Fund, a private equity and venture capital affiliate of Norwest Corporation, was founded in Minneapolis in 1961. It later merged with Wells Fargo in 1998.

The Northwest Growth Fund grew under the leadership of CEO Robert Zicarelli, including the opening of an office in Silicon Valley. Zicarelli retired in 1988 and was succeeded by Daniel Haggerty who retired in the 1990s. George J, Still, Jr. (now partner emeritus) and Promod Haque took over as managing partners in 1994.

Norwest's main LP is Wells Fargo (and Norwest Corporation before Wells Fargo merged with Norwest).

In January 2016, the firm announced Norwest Venture Partners XIII, a $1.2B fund, and Wells Fargo was the sole investor in this fund. In February 2018, the firm announced Norwest Venture Partners XIV, a $1.5B fund, in which Wells Fargo is a major investor. In November 2019, the firm announced the firm announced Norwest Venture Partners XV, a $2B fund, bringing its total capital under management to $9.5B.

In December 2021, the firm announced Norwest Venture Partners XVI, a $3B fund, bringing its total capital under management to $12.5B.

Investments
Notable investments for Norwest include: Adaptive Insights, Casper, Dairy Queen, Cray Dave, Kendra Scott, Opendoor, Plaid, Spotify, Uber, Talkspace, Udemy, and Wiliot.

Recognition
Inc. Founder Friendly Investors  
VCJ 50: The Top Venture Fundraisers of 2021
Top 25 Private Equity Firms for Growth Companies
Private Equity International 300

See also
 List of venture capital firms

References

Norwest Venture Partners raises $1.5 billion fund.  TechCrunch, February 14, 2018
Norwest Venture Partners forms new early-stage fund.  San Jose Business Journal, April 17, 2006
Saving Yipes. Forbes, July 17, 2002
Old Money Chasing the New; Seeing Windfalls, Big Banks Finance Start-Ups Again.  The New York Times, December 24, 1999

External links 
 

Companies based in Palo Alto, California
Investment banking private equity groups
Financial services companies established in 1961
Venture capital firms of the United States
1961 establishments in Minnesota